A reversed-field pinch (RFP) is a device used to produce and contain near-thermonuclear plasmas.  It is a toroidal pinch which uses a unique magnetic field configuration as a scheme to magnetically confine a plasma, primarily to study magnetic confinement fusion. Its magnetic geometry is somewhat different from that of the more common tokamak.  As one moves out radially, the portion of the magnetic field pointing toroidally reverses its direction, giving rise to the term reversed field.  This configuration can be sustained with comparatively lower fields than that of a tokamak of similar power density.  One of the disadvantages of this configuration is that it tends to be more susceptible to non-linear effects and turbulence.  This makes it a useful system for studying non-ideal (resistive) magnetohydrodynamics.  RFPs are also used in studying astrophysical plasmas, which share many common features.

The largest Reversed Field Pinch device presently in operation is the RFX (R/a = 2/0.46) in Padua, Italy. Others include the MST (R/a = 1.5/0.5) in the United States, EXTRAP T2R (R/a = 1.24/0.18) in Sweden, RELAX (R/a = 0.51/0.25) in Japan, and KTX (R/a = 1.4/0.4) in China.

Characteristics
Unlike the Tokamak, which has a much larger magnetic field in the toroidal direction than the poloidal direction, an RFP has a comparable field strength in both directions (though the sign of the toroidal field reverses).  Moreover, a typical RFP has a field strength approximately one half to one tenth that of a comparable Tokamak.  The RFP also relies on driving current in the plasma to reinforce the field from the magnets through the dynamo effect.

Magnetic topology 

The reversed-field pinch works towards a state of minimum energy.

The magnetic field lines coil loosely around a center torus. They coil outwards. Near the plasma edge, the toroidal magnetic field reverses and the field lines coil in the reverse direction. 

Internal fields are bigger than the fields at the magnets.

RFP in Fusion Research: comparison with other confinement configurations
The RFP has many features that make it a promising configuration for a potential fusion reactor.

Advantages 

Due to the lower overall fields, an RFP reactor might not need superconducting magnets.  This is a large advantage over tokamaks since superconducting magnets are delicate and expensive and so must be shielded from the neutron rich fusion environment.  RFPs are susceptible to surface instabilities and so require a close fitting shell.  Some experiments (such as the Madison Symmetric Torus) use their close fitting shell as a magnetic coil by driving current through the shell itself.  This is attractive from a reactor standpoint since a solid copper shell (for example) would be fairly robust against high energy neutrons, compared with superconducting magnets.  There is also no established beta limit for RFPs.  There exists a possibility that a reversed field pinch could achieve ignition solely with ohmic power (by driving current through the plasma and generating heat from electrical resistance, rather than through electron cyclotron resonance heating), which would be much simpler than tokamak designs, though it could not be operated in steady state.

Disadvantages 

Typically RFPs require a large amount of current to be driven, and although promising experiments are underway, there is no established method of replacing ohmically driven current, which is fundamentally limited by the machine parameters.  RFPs are also prone to tearing modes which lead to overlapping magnetic islands and therefore rapid transport from the core of the plasma to the edge.  These problems are areas of active research in the RFP community.

The plasma confinement in the best RFP's is only about 1% as good as in the best tokamaks. One reason for this is that all existing RFPs are relatively small. MST was larger than any previous RFP device, and thus it tested this important size issue..
The RFP is believed to require a shell with high electrical conductivity very close to the boundary of the plasma. This requirement is an unfortunate complication in a reactor. The Madison Symmetric Torus was designed to test this assumption and to learn how good the conductor must be and how close to the plasma it must be placed. In RFX, the thick shell was replaced with an active system of 192 coils, which cover the entire torus with their saddle shape, and response to the magnetic push of the plasma. Active control of plasma modes is also possible with this system.

Plasma Physics Research
The Reversed Field Pinch is also interesting from a physics standpoint.  RFP dynamics are highly turbulent.  RFPs also exhibit a strong plasma dynamo, similar to many astrophysical bodies.  Basic plasma science is another important aspect of Reversed Field Pinch research.

External links 
 RFX: Reversed-Field eXperiment
 Measurement of superthermal electron flow and temperature in a reversed-field pinch experiment by an electrostatic electron energy analyser

Magnetic confinement fusion